Northeastern University at Qinhuangdao is located in Qinhuangdao, Hebei, China under Northeastern University administration, which is a beautiful coastal city.

The campus is full of luxuriant forests and flowers. The architectural style of the buildings is very different, the environment is beautiful and fresh, the living facilities are perfect, and the cultural atmosphere is strong.

It has a student population of 9,932 and a staff population of 828 (548 are teachers, including 193 professors). It is a national key school and runs state key labs on its campus.

History
In 1976, the university was established and was named "721" University of Metallurgical Industry North Metallurgical Geology;
In 1982, it was renamed Qinhuangdao Metallurgical Geological Staff University
In 1987, it was merged into the Northeast Institute of Technology
In 1993, it was renamed Northeastern University at Qinhuangdao due to the Northeastern Institute of Technology was renamed Northeastern University
In 1996, it participated the project "Northeastern University's 211 project construction" and entered China's "211 Project”.
In 1998, as part of Northeastern University, it came under the administration of the Ministry of Education until now.
In 2001, it obtained independent admissions rights in China, and the right to manage e-registration and graduates was assigned to Northeastern University
In 2005, the graduate school was established
In 2006, it began to undertake the “985 Project” subproject of Northeastern University

School

Campus
The university occupies 700.68 mu (467,120 square meters) and the building area is 348,527.38 square meters. The university focus on the undergraduate education under the guidance of small but fine-tuned development. 
It owns Institute of Engineering Optimization and Smart Antennas (EOSA), Institute of Innovation and Venture Capital Ventures, Institute of Computer Applications, Institute of Internet of Things and Information Security (IITIS), Institute of New Materials, Institute of Environmental Pollution Control and Resource Recycling, Regional Economic Research Institute, Institute of Macro Management.
This university has a partnership with University of Illinois at Chicago.

Presidents

Notable people
Faculty
 Zhang Xueliang, Lin Huiyin, Liang Sicheng, Ding Lieyun

Graduate
 Liu Jiren, Shan Tianfang, Bo Yang, Guo Xiaochuan, Liu Changchun

References

Schools in China
Northeastern University (China)
Universities and colleges in Hebei